Mark Taylor (born March 7, 1977 in Scarborough, Ontario) is a Canadian actor known mainly for his roles as Eugene Donovan in Seventeen Again, Romeo in Student Bodies, and Kwest in Instant Star.

Early life and education
Taylor was born and raised in Toronto, but relocated to Palm Harbor, Florida during his last two years of high school, before returning to Toronto. 

Taylor studied computer engineering technology at Seneca College and graduated from Albert Campbell Collegiate Institute.

Acting career 

From 1997-2000, Taylor starred as Romeo in the teen sitcom Student Bodies. In 2000, he played Eugene Donovan in the film comedy Seventeen Again.  

This was later followed by his role as Kwest in the drama TV series Instant Star from 2005-2008.

He also played the role of Lewis 'Lou' Young in the Canadian police drama television series Flashpoint until his character was killed off in 2009 in the 23rd episode (part of the second season).

Filmography

Film

Television

Awards and nominations

References

External links 

1977 births
Living people
Canadian male television actors
Canadian male film actors
Canadian male voice actors
Black Canadian male actors
People from Scarborough, Toronto
Male actors from Toronto
Seneca College alumni